The  is a transport museum in Hiroshima, Japan, opened in March 1995.

Museum

Entrance and open-air square

Restaurant
Museum shop
Multipurpose hall
Library
Main Craft Room
The Vehicle
Rest and Information Corner
Battery Cart Corner
Windmills
Tram (Type 650, the "A-Bomb tram")

Collection floor
Transportation Vehicles of the World
True Scale Vehicles
Historical Scenes
City Runner
Dr.Vehicle Information
Collections of Memorabilia
Street Cars
Hyper Book
Special Exhibition Room

Panoramic floor
View Capsule
Vehicle Voice
Vehicle City
Panoramic Deck
City Guide
Operation Control
Dr.Vehicle Information

Access
Astram Chōrakuji Station

External links
Hiroshima City Transportation Museum

Museums established in 1995
Railway museums in Japan
Transport museums in Japan
Museums in Hiroshima
1995 establishments in Japan